William Neville John Thornton (born 1939 or 1940), known as Neville Thornton, is a former unionist politician in Northern Ireland.

Thornton studied at Portora Royal School and Stranmillis College, before becoming a teacher.  He also became the vice-president of the Fermanagh Young Unionist Association, and represented Northern Ireland in the Observer Mace debating competition.

At the 1970 general election, Thornton stood for the Ulster Unionist Party (UUP) in Mid Ulster, but was narrowly defeated by Bernadette Devlin.  He stood again at the February 1974 general election, in support of the Northern Ireland Assembly, but came bottom of the poll.  He became a full-time organiser for the UUP, but, increasingly at odds with the direction of the party, he resigned in 1974 to join the newly founded Unionist Party of Northern Ireland.

References

20th-century births
Living people
People educated at Portora Royal School
Politicians from County Fermanagh
Ulster Unionist Party politicians
Unionist Party of Northern Ireland politicians
Alumni of Stranmillis University College
Year of birth missing (living people)